Junelle Bromfield (born 8 February 1998) is a Jamaican athlete. She competed in the mixed 4 × 400 metres relay event at the 2020 Summer Olympics and won a bronze medal.

References

External links
 

1998 births
Living people
Jamaican female sprinters
Olympic athletes of Jamaica
Place of birth missing (living people)
Athletes (track and field) at the 2014 Summer Youth Olympics
Athletes (track and field) at the 2020 Summer Olympics
Medalists at the 2020 Summer Olympics
Olympic bronze medalists in athletics (track and field)
Olympic bronze medalists for Jamaica
Central American and Caribbean Games medalists in athletics
Central American and Caribbean Games silver medalists for Jamaica
Competitors at the 2018 Central American and Caribbean Games
World Athletics Indoor Championships winners
Commonwealth Games silver medallists for Jamaica
Commonwealth Games medallists in athletics
Athletes (track and field) at the 2022 Commonwealth Games
21st-century Jamaican women
Medallists at the 2022 Commonwealth Games